Moygoty (Moihoto) is a rural locality (a selo) in Tunkinsky District, Republic of Buryatia, Russia. The population was 5 as of 2010. There is 1 street.

Geography 
Moygoty is located 53 km west of Kyren (the district's administrative centre) by road. Turan is the nearest rural locality.

References 

Rural localities in Tunkinsky District